Roco Sandu (born 30 July 1966) is a former Romanian professional footballer. He was part of one of the best football generation of CSM Reșița with players like Leontin Doană, Vasile Ciocoi or Cristian Chivu.

References

External links
 

1966 births
Living people
Romanian footballers
People from Bocșa
Liga I players
Liga II players
CSM Reșița players
FC Politehnica Timișoara players
FC CFR Timișoara players
Romanian football managers
CSM Reșița managers
Association football midfielders